Mira Murati is the chief technology officer of OpenAI, the company that develops ChatGPT, an artificial intelligence chatbot.

Early life and education
Murati was born in 1988 in Vlorë, Albania, to Albanian parents.

She moved to Victoria, Canada at the age of 16 and attended Pearson United World College of the Pacific. She graduated from Thayer School of Engineering at Dartmouth College in 2012 with a Bachelor of Engineering degree in mechanical engineering.

Career
Murati started her career as an intern at Goldman Sachs in 2011, and took employment at Zodiac Aerospace from 2012 to 2013. She spent three years at Tesla, before joining Leap Motion. She then joined OpenAI in 2018, later becoming the chief technology officer, overseeing ChatGPT.

She is an advocate for the regulation of artificial intelligence.

References

External links 

 Mira Murati - Twitter

Living people
1988 births
Chief technology officers
American technology executives
American people of Albanian descent
Thayer School of Engineering alumni
Dartmouth College alumni
People educated at a United World College